Shadows in the Storm is a 1988 drama/thriller film directed by Terrell Tannen and starring Mia Sara, Ned Beatty, Michael Madsen and Troy Evans.

Plot 
Thelonious Pitt, a daydreaming businessman, goes to the Redwood Forests of California. There, he meets a beautiful woman, Melanie. She looks like the woman he has been seeing in his dreams.

At the river late at night, when Melanie's husband finds them, he attacks Thelonious until Melanie pulls out a pistol and fires three shots at her husband. His body goes into the river. That is when the nightmare begins.

Cast
 Ned Beatty as Thelonious Pitt
 Mia Sara as Melanie
 Michael Madsen as Earl
 Donna Mitchell as Elizabeth
 James Widdoes as Victor
 Joe Dorsey as Birkenstock (Joe Dorcey)
 William Bumiller as Terwilliger
 Peter Fox as Hotel Clerk
 Troy Evans as Detective Harris
 Bob Gould as Detective Wand
 Tracy Brooks Swope as Mercy
 Ramon Angeloni as Birkenstock's Assistant
 Marta Goldstein as Terwilliger's Girlfriend

Reception
Fred Haeseker of the Calgary Herald called the film, "a blunt stab at a traditional California film noir" and that it "stirs up not so much lurid menace as unrelieved tedium."

References

External links
 
 

1988 films
American thriller drama films
1980s thriller drama films
1988 drama films
1980s English-language films
1980s American films